Langsomt Mot Nord is the first of three albums by the Norwegian synth-duo Langsomt Mot Nord.

The album was released in the formats of LP and MC by Norwegian Famous Records in 1985. It was re-issued in 1989 by Sonet Records, now titled LMN.

Label: Famous Records
Record No: LMN 101, LMNC 101
Release year: 1985

Label: Sonet Records
Record No: KSCD 12
Release year: 1989

Musicians: Ola Snortheim; drums, drum programming. Jørn Christensen; keyboards, guitars, programming.

Guest musicians: Olav Snortheim; langeleik, bukkehorn. Kjersti Bergesen; vocals. Frank Hovland; bass.

Producers: Snortheim/Christensen/Lund.

Recording location: Sigma Studio, Bergen.

Tracks

 Demring (3:41)Composed By – Ola Snortheim, Jørn ChristensenArranged By – Jørn Christensen, Ola SnortheimProducers – Ola Snortheim, Jørn Christensen, Erling LundDrum Programming – Ola SnortheimKeyboards – Jørn Christensen
 Nissedans (3:04)Composed By – Ola Snortheim, Jørn ChristensenArranged By – Jørn Christensen, Ola SnortheimProducers – Ola Snortheim, Jørn Christensen, Erling LundDrum Programming – Ola SnortheimKeyboards – Jørn ChristensenElectric Guitar – Jørn Christensen
 Gjetarlåt Frå Hallingdal (2:00)Composed By – Ola Snortheim, Jørn ChristensenArranged By – Jørn Christensen, Ola SnortheimProducers – Ola Snortheim, Jørn Christensen, Erling LundDrum Programming – Ola SnortheimKeyboards – Jørn ChristensenBukkehorn – Olav Snortheim
 Tusselåt (2:38)Composed By – Ola Snortheim, Jørn ChristensenArranged By – Jørn Christensen, Ola SnortheimProducers – Ola Snortheim, Jørn Christensen, Erling LundDrum Programming – Ola SnortheimKeyboards – Jørn ChristensenLangeleik – Olav Snortheim
 LMN (3:36)Composed By – Ola Snortheim, Jørn ChristensenArranged By – Jørn Christensen, Ola SnortheimProducers – Ola Snortheim, Jørn Christensen, Erling LundDrum Programming – Ola SnortheimKeyboards – Jørn ChristensenVocals – Kjersti BergesenElectric Guitar – Jørn ChristensenBass – Frank Hovland
 Rannveig's Voggevise (2:07)Composed By – Ola Snortheim, Jørn ChristensenArranged By – Jørn Christensen, Ola SnortheimProducers – Ola Snortheim, Jørn Christensen, Erling LundDrum Programming – Ola SnortheimKeyboards – Jørn ChristensenAcoustic Guitar – Jørn Christensen
 Juleskreia (4:17)Composed By – Ola Snortheim, Jørn ChristensenArranged By – Jørn Christensen, Ola SnortheimProducers – Ola Snortheim, Jørn Christensen, Erling LundDrum Programming – Ola SnortheimKeyboards – Jørn Christensen
 Min Sol, Min Lyst, Min Glede (1:12)Composed By – Ola Snortheim, Jørn ChristensenArranged By – Jørn Christensen, Ola SnortheimProducers – Ola Snortheim, Jørn Christensen, Erling LundDrum Programming – Ola SnortheimKeyboards – Jørn ChristensenBukkehorn – Olav Snortheim
 Hymne (3:42)Composed By – Ola Snortheim, Jørn ChristensenArranged By – Jørn Christensen, Ola SnortheimProducers – Ola Snortheim, Jørn Christensen, Erling LundDrum Programming – Ola SnortheimKeyboards – Jørn ChristensenVocals – Kjersti BergesenAcousic Guitar – Jørn ChristensenBass – Frank Hovland
 Ola Drar Til Myklagard (3:37)Composed By – Ola Snortheim, Jørn ChristensenArranged By – Jørn Christensen, Ola SnortheimProducers – Ola Snortheim, Jørn Christensen, Erling LundDrum Programming – Ola SnortheimKeyboards – Jørn ChristensenElectric Guitar – Jørn Christensen
 Frøya's Bryllup (1:53)Composed By – Ola Snortheim, Jørn ChristensenArranged By – Jørn Christensen, Ola SnortheimProducers – Ola Snortheim, Jørn Christensen, Erling LundDrum Programming – Ola SnortheimKeyboards – Jørn Christensen
 Gollum (3:29)Composed By – Ola Snortheim, Jørn ChristensenArranged By – Jørn Christensen, Ola SnortheimProducers – Ola Snortheim, Jørn Christensen, Erling LundDrum Programming – Ola SnortheimKeyboards – Jørn Christensen
 Sørgemarsj (2:57)Composed By – Ola Snortheim, Jørn ChristensenArranged By – Jørn Christensen, Ola SnortheimProducers – Ola Snortheim, Jørn Christensen, Erling LundDrum Programming – Ola SnortheimKeyboards – Jørn Christensen
 Jeg Ser Deg Søte Lam (1:20)Composed By – Ola Snortheim, Jørn ChristensenArranged By – Jørn Christensen, Ola SnortheimProducers – Ola Snortheim, Jørn Christensen, Erling LundDrum Programming – Ola SnortheimKeyboards – Jørn ChristensenVocals – Kjersti BergesenBukkehorn – Olav Snortheim
 Hillajah (3:17)Composed By – Ola Snortheim, Jørn ChristensenArranged By – Jørn Christensen, Ola SnortheimProducers – Ola Snortheim, Jørn Christensen, Erling LundDrum Programming – Ola SnortheimKeyboards – Jørn Christensen

Credits

 Drum Programming, Drums – Ola Snortheim
 Keyboards, Synthesizers – Jørn Christensen
 Programming – Jørn Christensen
 Sequencing – Jørn Christensen
 Sounds – Jørn Christensen
 Technician – Erling Lund
 Mixed By – Erling Lund, Ola Snortheim, Jørn Christensen
 Cover Photo – Fin Serck-Hanssen

Sources in Norwegian 

 Langsomt Mot Nord Wikipedia
 LMN (1985) Rockipedia

References

External links 

 Langsomt Mot Nord's official web-page
 Langsomt Mot Nord Discogs

Langsomt Mot Nord albums
1991 albums